Anurag Singh (born 10 October 1990) is an Indian cricketer who played for Madhya Pradesh at Indian domestic level between 2013 and 2015. A right handed batsman and a left-arm medium pace bowler, Singh made his List A debut in February 2013 against Uttar Pradesh. Later that year, in December, he made his first class debut against Saurashtra in Indore. He did not play either List A or First Class cricket after 2013, but did make three appearances in domestic T20s in April 2015.

References

1990 births
Madhya Pradesh cricketers
Living people
Place of birth missing (living people)
Indian cricketers